Shruthi (ಶೃತಿ) is a 1990 Indian Kannada-language musical-drama film directed and produced by Dwarakish. The story is a remake of the successful Tamil film Pudhu Vasantham (1990) directed and written by Vikraman. The film starred Sunil, Indudhar, Honnavalli Krishna, Srivatsa, Dileep and Shruti. It was through this film Shruti got her screen name which became her identity throughout her career. The music was composed by S. A. Rajkumar to the lyrics of Chi. Udaya Shankar, M. N. Vyasa Rao and R. N. Jayagopal.

Plot
The film tells the story of four struggling friends aspiring to be musicians who accidentally meet a girl Shruthi who is in search of her lover. 
Shruthi joins the gang of friends and helps them to change their fortunes in the music industry. 
The sudden arrival of Shruthi's lover takes a turn on their relationships.

Cast

 Sunil as Krishna 
 Shruti as Sruthi
 Indudhar as Gopi 
 Honnavalli Krishna as Seena 
 Srivatsa as Robert 
 Dileep as Vijay 
 Mandeep Roy
 Vaishali Kasaravalli
 Srinath
 Geetha Srinath 
 Chethan Ramarao
 Kunigal Vasanth 
 Manju Malini 
 Shankar Rao

Soundtrack
All the songs are composed and scored by S. A. Rajkumar who also scored for the original Tamil film. The songs were appreciated upon release.

References

1990 films
1990s Kannada-language films
Indian musical drama films
Indian buddy films
1990s buddy films
Films scored by S. A. Rajkumar
Kannada remakes of Tamil films
Films about composers
1990s musical drama films
Films directed by Dwarakish
1990 drama films